The 2021–22 Maine Black Bears Men's ice hockey season was the 47th season of play for the program, the 45th season competing at the Division I level, and the 38th season in the Hockey East conference. The Black Bears represented the University of Maine and played their home games at Alfond Arena, and were coached by Ben Barr, in his 1st season as head coach.

Season
With the still recovering from the sudden death of the previous head coach, Red Gendron, Maine struggled through the early part of the season. Despite returning almost off the players from the previous season, the offense was unable to coalesce and proved to be a hindrance for the Black Bears' success. Maine was shutout seven times during the season and finished as one of the lowest goal for in the nation. Compounding their problems was a less-than-stellar performance in goal. Victor Östman and Matthew Thiessen split the starting job but both were fairly inconsistent.

Maine's start doomed their postseason hopes and by mid-December the Black Bears had just 1 win in 16 games. They played better in the second half, Nearly quadrupling their win total, and took games from Massachusetts and Boston University, both ranked teams. Unfortunately, Maine could never put together a string of good play and ended the year with the worst record in Hockey East. In their only playoff match, the Bears were soundly beaten by Merrimack. While the overall results were lackluster, the team did show improvement as the year went on.

Departures

Recruiting

Roster
As of August 19, 2021.

Standings

Schedule and results

|-
!colspan=12 style=";" | Exhibition

|-
!colspan=12 style=";" | Regular Season

|-
!colspan=12 style=";" |

Scoring statistics

Goaltending statistics

Rankings

Note: USCHO did not release a poll in week 24.

Awards and honors

References

2021–22
2021–22 Hockey East men's ice hockey season
2021–22 NCAA Division I men's ice hockey by team
2021 in sports in Maine
2022 in sports in Maine